Anastasiia Krapivina (also transliterated Anastasiya Krapivina, born 12 November 1994 in Lipetsk) is a Russian swimmer. She competed in the women's marathon 10 kilometre event at the 2016 Summer Olympics.

In 2019, she competed in the women's 10 km event at the 2019 World Aquatics Championships held in Gwangju, South Korea and she finished in 20th place.

References

External links
 
 
 

1994 births
Living people
Russian female swimmers
Female long-distance swimmers
Olympic swimmers of Russia
Swimmers at the 2016 Summer Olympics
People from Lipetsk
20th-century Russian women
21st-century Russian women